Clarkesville may refer to:

 Clarkesville, Georgia
 Clarkesville, Alabama
 Clarkesville, Illinois

See also
 Clarksville (disambiguation)